A wetu is a domed hut, used by some north-eastern Native American tribes such as the Wampanoag. They provided shelter, sometimes seasonal or temporary, for families near the wooded coast for hunting and fishing. They were made out of sticks of a red cedar frame covered with either tree bark or mats made from grass or reeds.

References

Further reading

External links
 A discussion of the wetu with Tim Turner, manager of the Wampanoag Indigenous Program at Plimouth Plantation.
 An almost four-minute video interview about a wetu

Traditional Native American dwellings
Wampanoag
Huts in the United States